Minolia malcolmia is a species of sea snail, a marine gastropod mollusk in the family Solariellidae.

Description
The height of the shell attains 3.5 mm, its diameter 6 mm. The solid shell has a depressed conical shape. It is narrowly umbilicated. The shell contains 4½ whorls. The small aperture has an ovate-triangular shape. The columellar margin has a slight callus. This is a small, subconical, solid species, not so shining as some of its allies. It has red-brown speckled markings. It has no angle at the periphery. It is slightly depressed and crenulated at the sutures.

Distribution
The marine species occurs off the Philippines.

References

malcolmia
Gastropods described in 1891